Joan Johnson may refer to:

Joan Johnson (engineer), see Deputy Assistant Secretary of the Navy (Research, Development, Test & Evaluation)
Joan Johnson (politician), see United States House of Representatives elections, 2000
Joan Johnson (musician), in The Dixie Cups
Joan Johnson, character in 20 Mule Team
Joan Johnson (tennis), finalist in the 1959 Swedish Open

See also
Joan Johnston, author